Shaytan pl. Shayatin is a Hebrew and Arabic term referring to Satan or to satans. 

The name Shaytan may refer to:

Mythology
 Al-Shaitan, Satan in Islam
 Shaitan, demon in Islamic mythology
 Accuser angel, angels in Jewish Talmud, who tempt humans into sin, and later accuse them on Gods heavenly court
 satans, used in reference to fallen angels in Enoch

See also
 Shaitan (film)
 Gerd Sheytan, a village in Iran